The 1990 NBA draft took place on June 27, 1990, in New York City, New York. One of the standouts of this draft is Basketball Hall of Famer Gary Payton. He became a nine-time All-Star, achieved the NBA Defensive Player of the Year award in 1996, won an NBA Championship with the Miami Heat in 2006, holds many statistical records during his tenure with the since rebranded and relocated Seattle SuperSonics, and was inducted in the Hall of Fame in 2013.

The top pick of the draft was Syracuse's Derrick Coleman who was selected by the New Jersey Nets. In total, 52 of the 54 players selected went on to play at least one competitive game in the NBA, and six players were at some point of their career selected to play in the NBA All-Star Game. One player who had been projected to be a lottery pick as well as possibly the number one  by media outlets and draft analysts was Loyola Marymount's Hank Gathers, who died of a heart condition in March 1990 after collapsing during a game.

Draft selections

Notable undrafted players
These players were not selected in the 1990 draft but played at least one game in the NBA.

Early entrants

College underclassmen
The following college basketball players successfully applied for early draft entrance.

  Kelvin Ardister – F, Idaho (junior)
  Herb Barthol – C, Cleveland State (junior)
  Gabriel Estaba – F, South Alabama (junior)
  David Shon Henderson – G, Idaho (junior)
  Carl Herrera – F, Houston (junior)
  Sean Higgins – F, Michigan (junior)
  Chris Jackson – G, LSU (sophomore)
  Marcus Liberty – F, Illinois (junior)
  Kenny Miller – F, Barton County CC (junior)
  Jerrod Mustaf – F, Maryland (sophomore)
  Dennis Scott – F, Georgia Tech (junior)
  Per Stumer – F, Loyola Marymount (junior)
  Kenny Williams – F, Elizabeth City State (sophomore)

Other eligible players

Notes

See also
 List of first overall NBA draft picks

References

External links
 1990 NBA Draft

Draft
National Basketball Association draft
NBA draft
1990s in Manhattan
Basketball in New York City
Madison Square Garden
Sports in Manhattan
NBA draft
Sporting events in New York City